Mohamed Jbour (born 15 September 1944) is a Jordanian sports shooter. He competed at the 1980 Summer Olympics and the 1984 Summer Olympics.

References

1944 births
Living people
Jordanian male sport shooters
Olympic shooters of Jordan
Shooters at the 1980 Summer Olympics
Shooters at the 1984 Summer Olympics
Place of birth missing (living people)
20th-century Jordanian people